The second USS Sanders (DE-40) was an Evarts class destroyer escort constructed for the United States Navy during World War II. She was sent to the Pacific Ocean to protect convoys and other shipping from Japanese submarines and fighter aircraft. She performed dangerous work in major battle areas and was awarded four battle stars.

She was originally designated for transfer to the United Kingdom. As BDE-40, she was laid down on 7 September 1942 by the Puget Sound Navy Yard, Bremerton, Washington; named Sanders on 14 June 1943; reclassified DE-40 on 16 June 1943; launched on 18 June 1943; and commissioned on 1 October 1943.

Namesake
Eugene Thomas Sanders was born on 15 March 1899 in Hubbard, Oregon. He enlisted in the United States Army on 16 June 1917, he was discharged on 13 February 1919. Appointed Ensign on 3 November 1941, he died on Arizona during the Japanese Attack on Pearl Harbor on 7 December 1941.

Service history
After shakedown, Sanders participated in patrol and escort duties in the Gilbert and Marshall Islands from January–July 1944, including a bombardment of Kusaie Island on 1 June. She then escorted support shipping to the Mariana Islands from August through October. Following patrol and escort duties in the Gilbert and Marshall Islands from November–March 1945, she guarded a logistics support group, supplying fast carrier task forces in the western Pacific, from April–June. Sailing via Pearl Harbor, she arrived at San Francisco, California, on 15 July for overhaul.

Remaining on the United States West Coast, she was decommissioned on 19 December 1945. Struck from the Naval Vessel Register on 8 January 1946, she was delivered, on 8 May 1947, to the National Metal and Steel Corp., Terminal Island, California, and scrapped in 1948.

Awards

References

External links
NavSource Online: Destroyer Escort Photo Archive - USS Sanders (DE-40)

Evarts-class destroyer escorts
Ships built in Bremerton, Washington
1943 ships
World War II frigates and destroyer escorts of the United States